In Ohio, State Route 333 may refer to:
Ohio State Route 333 (1930s), now part of SR 152
Ohio State Route 333 (1946–1962), Holland Sylvania Road north of US 20